Kurishima is a Japanese surname. Notable people with the surname include:

, Japanese women's footballer
, Japanese actress and dancer

Japanese-language surnames